The phrase least common divisor is a confusion of the following two distinct concepts in arithmetic:

 Least common multiple
 Greatest common divisor